Monosyntaxis holmanhunti is a moth of the family Erebidae. It was described by George Hampson in 1914. It is found on Peninsular Malaysia, Borneo, Java and Bali.

References

Lithosiina
Moths described in 1914